Con-G  is a non-profit fan-run multigenre convention, held in February in Guelph, Ontario, Canada from 2009 to 2014.  'Con-G' was brought back from the dead starting in 2021 as a virtual online convention Con-G - Geeks@Home  in response to the COVID-19 pandemic. The convention was originally created as a Japanese anime convention but subsequently covered many other aspects of geek culture, such as Steampunk, Sci-Fi, Fantasy, Gaming etc. The name Con-G came from a combination of the words "Convention Guelph" and was a play on words on the Japanese writing system kanji.

Con-G was brought back from the dead starting in 2021 as a virtual online convention Con-G - Geeks@Home  in response to the COVID-19 pandemic.

History

Mascot 
Kon, the Con-G mascot, was a cartoon Japanese dragon.  He was green with a white belly and a purple mane, and was often depicted holding a calligraphy brush.  He was created for Con-G by artist Lindsay Pattillo.

References

External links 
 Official Con-G website

Defunct multigenre conventions
Culture of Guelph
Tourist attractions in Guelph
Conventions in Canada